Curtis Duane Young, Sr. (born May 29, 1968) is a former professional American football tight end in the National Football League.  He played for six seasons with the San Diego Chargers (1991–1995) and the Buffalo Bills (1998). He played college football at Michigan State University. He is from Kalamazoo, Michigan and is a graduate of Kalamazoo Central High School. Since retiring from the NFL he has coached many high school teams. Most recently he was the head coach at Loy Norrix High School in Kalamazoo.

References

1968 births
Living people
American football tight ends
Buffalo Bills players
Michigan State Spartans football players
San Diego Chargers players
High school football coaches in Michigan
Sportspeople from Kalamazoo, Michigan
Players of American football from Michigan
African-American coaches of American football
African-American players of American football
21st-century African-American people
20th-century African-American sportspeople